Per Holten Møller (born 30 August 1952) is a Danish former ice hockey player. He is currently the head coach Copenhagen Hockey.

From 1970 to 1984 he played 159 matches for Denmark men's national ice hockey team. In the period 1989 to 1994 he was the coach of the national team.

Today Per Holten Møller is a teacher on Vallerødskolen in Hørsholm, Denmark, where he teaches subjects like math, P.E. and history. He is married and has two children.

External links

1952 births
Danish ice hockey defencemen
Danish ice hockey coaches
People from Hørsholm Municipality
Living people
Sportspeople from the Capital Region of Denmark